Earl Dean Hall (born July 15, 1879, in Tunnel City, Wisconsin) was a member of the Wisconsin State Assembly. He was elected to the Assembly in 1924 and served until 1937 and then from 1951 to 1955 as a Republican and as a Progressive. Additionally, he was a member of the Monroe County, Wisconsin Board of Supervisors and served on the Monroe County Highway Commission. Hall worked for the railroad and was a farmer. Hall died from a heart attack on May 23, 1959.

References

External links

People from Monroe County, Wisconsin
Farmers from Wisconsin
County supervisors in Wisconsin
Republican Party members of the Wisconsin State Assembly
Wisconsin Progressives (1924)
20th-century American politicians
1879 births
1959 deaths